Pinna muricata is a species of bivalves belonging to the family Pinnidae. 

The species is found in almost all oceans.

References

 Dautzenberg P. (1929). Contribution à l'étude de la faune de Madagascar: Mollusca marina testacea. Faune des colonies françaises, 3(4): 321-636, pls 4-7. Société d'Editions géographiques, maritimes et coloniales, Paris.
 Kilburn, R.N. & Rippey, E. (1982) Sea Shells of Southern Africa. Macmillan South Africa, Johannesburg, xi + 249 pp.
 Steyn, D.G. & Lussi, M. (1998) Marine Shells of South Africa. An Illustrated Collector's Guide to Beached Shells. Ekogilde Publishers, Hartebeespoort, South Africa, ii + 264 pp.
 City University of Hong Kong. (2000). Study of the suitablility of Ping Chau to be established as marine park or marine reserve. Final report submitted to the Agriculture, Fisheries and Conservation Department, The Hong Kong SAR Government.
 Liu, J.Y. [Ruiyu] (ed.). (2008). Checklist of marine biota of China seas. China Science Press. 1267 pp.
 Huber, M. (2010). Compendium of bivalves. A full-color guide to 3,300 of the world's marine bivalves. A status on Bivalvia after 250 years of research. Hackenheim: ConchBooks. 901 pp., 1 CD-ROM.

External links
 Linnaeus, C. (1758). Systema Naturae per regna tria naturae, secundum classes, ordines, genera, species, cum characteribus, differentiis, synonymis, locis. Editio decima, reformata [10th revised edition, vol. 1: 824 pp. Laurentius Salvius: Holmiae.]
 Martens, E. von. (1880). Mollusken. Pp. 179-353, pl. 19-22 In K. Möbius, F. Richters & E. von Martens, Beiträge zur Meeresfauna der Insel Mauritius und der Seychellen. Berlin: Gutmann.
 Dall, W. H.; Bartsch, P. & Rehder, H. A. (1938). A manual of the Recent and fossil marine pelecypod mollusks of the Hawaiian Islands. Bulletin of the Bernice P. Bishop Museum. 153: 1-233, 58 pls.
 Reeve, L. A. (1858-1859). Monograph of the genus Pinna. In: Conchologia Iconica, or, illustrations of the shells of molluscous animals, vol. 11, pl. 1-34 and unpaginated text. L. Reeve & Co., London.
 Branch, G. M. (2002). Two Oceans. 5th impression. David Philip, Cate Town & Johannesburg

Pinnidae